Local elections were held in Santa Rosa City on May 9, 2022, within the Philippine general election. The voters elected for the elective local posts in the city: the mayor, vice mayor, the congressman, and twelve councilors.

Overview
Incumbent Mayor Arlene B. Arcillas, who is on her first consecutive term, sought for re-election under PDP-Laban. His opponents were incumbent Vice Mayor Arnel Gomez (Bigkis Pinoy) and Joyce Kathlene Lee (Independent).

Mayor Arcillas's brother, Arnold, sought a comeback for Vice Mayor under PDP-Laban; he previously held the position from 2016 until 2019, when he was defeated by Arnel Gomez. His opponents were Alvin Abaja (Aksyon) and Onofre Sumapid, Jr. (Independent).

Furthermore, Santa Rosa was granted its own representation in the House of Representatives as one at-large district beginning in 2022 by virtue of Republic Act No. 11395 signed on August 28, 2019. With this, the city gained two additional seats in its Sangguniang Panlungsod, thus electing twelve councilors.

Candidates

Administration ticket

Opposition ticket

Others

Independents

Results

House of Representatives
Incumbent Laguna 1st district representative Dan Fernandez defeated former councilor Petronio "Boy" Factoriza Jr. to become the new district's first representative.

Mayor
Incumbent Mayor Arlene B. Arcillas was re-elected, defeating Vice Mayor Arnel Gomez and Joyce Kathlene Lee.

Vice Mayor
Former Vice Mayor Arnold Arcillas defeated Alvin Abaja and Onofre Sumapid Jr., earning his second non-consecutive term and comeback to the position.

Councilors

|-bgcolor=black
|colspan=8|

References

2022 Philippine local elections
Elections in Santa Rosa, Laguna
May 2022 events in the Philippines
2022 elections in Calabarzon